More Songs About Buildings and Food is the second studio album by American rock band Talking Heads, released on July 14, 1978, by Sire Records. It was the first of three albums produced by collaborator Brian Eno, and saw the band move toward an increasingly danceable style, crossing singer David Byrne's unusual delivery with new emphasis on the rhythm section composed of bassist Tina Weymouth and drummer Chris Frantz.

More Songs established Talking Heads as a critical success, reaching number 29 on the US Billboard Pop Albums chart and number 21 on the UK Albums Chart. The album featured the band's first top-thirty single, a cover of Al Green's "Take Me to the River".

Artwork and title
The front cover of the album, conceived by Byrne and executed by artist Jimmy De Sana, is a photomosaic of the band comprising 529 close-up Polaroid photographs. The album's rear cover shows "Portrait U.S.A.", an image of the United States from space.

In a 1979 interview with Creem, Tina Weymouth said of the title:

XTC frontman Andy Partridge later claimed, however, that he gave the title to Byrne.

Release
More Songs About Buildings and Food was released on July 21, 1978. It peaked at number 29 on the Billboard Pop Albums chart. The album's sole single, a cover of the Al Green hit "Take Me to the River", peaked at number 26 on the pop singles chart in 1979. The single pushed the album to gold record status.

Warner Music Group re-released and remastered the album in 2005, on its Warner Bros., Sire and Rhino Records labels in DualDisc format, with four bonus tracks on the CD side—"Stay Hungry" (1977 version), alternate versions of "I'm Not in Love" and "The Big Country", and the 'Country Angel' version of "Thank You for Sending Me an Angel". The DVD-Audio side includes both stereo and 5.1 surround high resolution (96 kHz/24bit) mixes, as well as a Dolby Digital version and videos of the band performing "Found a Job" and "Warning Sign". In Europe, it was released as a CD+DVDA two-disc set rather than a single DualDisc. The reissue was produced by Andy Zax with Talking Heads.

Reception

Writing for Christgau's Record Guide: Rock Albums of the Seventies (1981),  critic Robert Christgau said "Here the Heads become a quintet in an ideal producer-artist collaboration—Eno contributes/interferes just enough... Every one of these eleven songs is a positive pleasure, and on every one the tension between Byrne's compulsive flights and the sinuous rock bottom of the music is the focus".

More Songs About Buildings and Food was ranked at number four among the top "Albums of the Year" for 1978 by NME, with "Take Me to the River" ranked at number 16 among the year's top tracks. In 2003, the album was ranked number 382 on Rolling Stones list of the 500 greatest albums of all time, 383 in 2012, and 364 in 2020. It was ranked number 57 on Rolling Stones list of the greatest albums of 1967–1987.

It was ranked the 45th best album of the 1970s by Pitchfork in 2006. Reviewing the album for Pitchfork, Nick Sylvester said: "More Songs About Buildings and Food transformed the Talking Heads from a quirky CBGB spectacle to a quirky near-unanimously regarded 'it' band."

Track listing 

 Note
(*) Mixed at Mediasound Studios by Brian Eno and Ed Stasium

Personnel 

Talking Heads
 David Byrne – lead vocals, guitars, synthesized percussion
 Chris Frantz – drums, percussion
 Jerry Harrison – piano, organ, synthesizer, guitar, backing vocals
 Tina Weymouth – bass guitar

Additional musicians
 Brian Eno – synthesizers, piano, guitar, percussion, backing vocals
 Tina and the Typing Pool – backing vocals on "The Good Thing"

Production
 Benji Armbrister – assistant engineer
 Rhett Davies – engineer, mixing
 Joe Gastwirt – mastering
 Ed Stasium – mixing on "Found a Job"

Charts

Weekly charts

Year-end charts

Certifications and sales

References 

1978 albums
Talking Heads albums
Albums produced by Brian Eno
Albums produced by David Byrne
Albums produced by Chris Frantz
Albums produced by Jerry Harrison
Albums produced by Tina Weymouth
Sire Records albums
Avant-pop albums